Doddikatta  is a village near Bajpe in the Dakshina Kannada district of Karnataka, India.

The village and its temple and is a holy shrine for Hindus. The main deity at the temple is Swambhoolingeshwara or Lord Shiva.

Thousands of devotees who visit Doddikatta every day to seek blessings from Lord Shiva. Many devotees from all around the world visit this shrine to worship holy lord Shiva on the auspicious day of Shivaratri.

Regular Poojas are conducted three times a day in the temple and special poojas like Rudrabhisheka are conducted periodically. Major Festivals, like Mahashivaratri, are celebrated by a large number of devotees with much gaiety and religious activities.

The kshetra is unique for housing 32 Kuladevatas and the ever-growing Linga which has grown for years with no carving or sculpting. In the interpretations of some priests, the thin vertical dividing line denotes Shiva and Parvati together.

References 

Villages in Dakshina Kannada district